Jermaine Charles Williams is an American actor, producer, and dancer. He dances for the Norwood Kids Foundation.

He is from Rialto, California.

He is best known for his role as Mush Mouth in Fat Albert and Noel in Stomp the Yard. He appeared in the spoof film The Comebacks as iPod. He co-starred as Coleman "The Slaw" Galloway in the Disney Channel Original Series The Jersey.

Filmography

References

External links

Living people
American male dancers
African-American male dancers
African-American male actors
American male child actors
American male film actors
American male television actors
Place of birth missing (living people)
1982 births
21st-century African-American people
20th-century African-American people